Hull may refer to:

Structures

 Chassis, of an armored fighting vehicle
 Fuselage, of an aircraft
 Hull (botany), the outer covering of seeds
 Hull (watercraft), the body or frame of a ship
 Submarine hull

Mathematics
 Affine hull, in affine geometry
 Conical hull, in convex geometry
 Convex hull, in convex geometry
 Carathéodory's theorem (convex hull)
 Holomorphically convex hull, in complex analysis
 Injective hull, of a module
 Linear hull, another name for the linear span
 Skolem hull, of mathematical logic

Places

United Kingdom

England
 Hull, the common name of Kingston upon Hull, a city in the East Riding of Yorkshire
 Hull City A.F.C., a football team
 Hull FC, rugby league club formed in 1865, based in the west of the city
 Hull Kingston Rovers (Hull KR), rugby league club formed in 1882, based in the east of the city
 Port of Hull
 University of Hull
 River Hull, river in the East Riding of Yorkshire

Canada
 Hull, Quebec, a settlement opposite Ottawa, now part of the city of Gatineau
 Hull (provincial electoral district)
 Hull (federal electoral district), now named Hull—Aylmer

United States
 Hull, Florida
 Hull, Georgia
 Hull, Illinois
 Hull, Iowa
 Hull, Massachusetts
 Hull, North Dakota
 Hull, Texas
 Hull, West Virginia
 Hull, Marathon County, Wisconsin
 Hull, Portage County, Wisconsin

Other places
 Hul, Nové Zámky District, Slovakia
 Hull Island (disambiguation), several places

People

 List of people with surname Hull

Other uses

 Hull classification symbol (hull code or hull number), a system to identify ships
 Hull House, a settlement house in Chicago, Illinois, United States
 USS Hull, any of four U.S. Navy ships
 Hull note, the final U.S. proposal delivered to the Empire of Japan before the attack on Pearl Harbor

See also
 
 
 Hulk (ship)
 Hull–White model of interest rates, in economics